Brian Gottfried and Tomáš Šmíd were the defending champions but did not compete that year.

Scott Davis and David Pate won in the final 3–6, 7–6, 7–6 against Ken Flach and Robert Seguso.

Seeds
Champion seeds are indicated in bold text while text in italics indicates the round in which those seeds were eliminated.

Draw

Final

Top half

Bottom half

External links
 1985 Volvo International Doubles Draw

Doubles